A kalbaisakhi, also known in Assam as a bordoisila and in some English publications as a nor'wester, is a localised rainfall and thunderstorm event which occurs in Bangladesh as well as the Indian states of Bihar, Jharkhand, Odisha, Tripura and West Bengal. These storms generally occur in the afternoon or just before sunset, when thick dark black clouds start appearing over the sky and then bring gale-speed wind with torrential rain, often with hail, but spanning only a short period of time.

Etymology 
In Bengali, "kalbaisakhi" refers to a "fateful thing" which occurs in the Bengali month of Baishakh. The term "nor'wester" is more commonly used in English newspapers since these storms travel from northwest to southeast. In Assam, the event is known as a bordoisila, which is derived from the Bodo word bardoisikhla, in which bar means wind, dol means water and sikhla means girl, represents the goddess of nature, wind and rain and also marks the beginning of the Assamese month Bohag or Baishagu.

Genesis 

The period of nor'wester formation generally begins in April and lasts until the monsoon establishes itself over Northeast India, although March nor'westers are not unknown. Based on event descriptions and the meteorological environments involved, these storms can be classified as progressive derechos. These storms originate over the Chhotanagpur Plateau between the states of Bihar and Jharkhand. They gradually gain strength as they move southeastwards and impact the states of Odisha, West Bengal and Assam with gale-speed winds (often exceeding ), torrential rains and hailstorms. On some occasions, incursion of moist air in these elevated places, when combined with high surface temperatures, causes violent thunderstorms. Tornadoes also rarely form if there is enough moisture, convection and heat in the Ganga-Brahmaputra delta such as a tornado hit in Bangladesh's Manikganj district of Dhaka division which became the deadliest tornado in the history.

Effects 
Kalbaisakhi bring destruction by uprooting trees due to gale-winds and waterlogging roads due to heavy rainfall. It often damages crop by hailstorms. However it is extremely helpful for kharif crops like jute, paddy, etc. and give relief after the mid-day heat and give rainfall to the dry soils for the development of the crops.

Due to global warming, these storms are becoming infrequent and becoming stronger, causing more destruction.

In Bengali literature 
Many Bengali poets and artists have been regarded kalbaisakhi as events of astounding beauty. Bengali poet Mohit Lal Majumder described the storm in his poem "Kalbaisakhi", and the storms also inspired Rabindranath Tagore's poem "Esho Hey Baisakh".

References

Weather hazards
Climate of Asia